The second season of Shark Tank India premiered on 2 January 2023.

Sharks 
List of Sharks from shark tank panel with their net worth. Any five of the following six sharks (or all six sharks in episodes 48-50) are present in each episode.

Pitches and investments by sharks

Specials
This season introduced various special segments like Beyond the Tank, which followed the progress and journey of the entrepreneurs who appeared in the previous season and their businesses, and Swimming with the Sharks, which traced the sharks personal and professional lives off-camera. Vineeta also made a pitch at the last episode of the shark tank season 2.

Beyond the Tank

In popular culture 
The sharks made an appearance in the fourteenth season of Kaun Banega Crorepati, and in The Kapil Sharma Show.

References 

Shark Tank